Téa is a female given name of French origin.

Notable people with the name include:

 Téa Leoni, American actress
 Téa Mutonji, Canadian writer and poet
 Téa Obreht, Serbian-American author

Notable fictional characters with the name include:

 Téa Delgado, a character on One Life to Live
 Téa Gardner, the alternative name for Yu-Gi-Oh! character Anzu Mazaki

Cognates
 Tea (given name)
 Thea (name)
 Theia

Feminine given names